The Cuenca Tramway is a tram line in the Ecuadorian city of Cuenca.

Background
Construction began in November 2013, with the city of Cuenca signing a US$142.6m contract with the CITA Cuenca consortium, which is led by Alstom and includes CIM, Ineo, and TSO, the same year. Testing of the tramway's Alstom Citadis rolling stock on the southernmost part of the line began in 2015, and test runs over the full route began in July 2018.

In September 2018 an agreement with Metro Tenerife was signed by Cuenca municipality to operate the tramway.

Route
The 10.7 km route begins at Parque Industrial and ends at Rio Tarqui, and as of 2018 was forecast to carry 120,000 daily passengers.

See also
 Quito Metro
 Empresa de Ferrocarriles Ecuatorianos

References

External links
 

Light rail in Ecuador
2020 establishments in Ecuador
Railway lines opened in 2020
Cuenca, Ecuador